Sabinene is a natural bicyclic monoterpene with the molecular formula C10H16.  It is isolated from the essential oils of a variety of plants including Marjoram, holm oak (Quercus ilex) and Norway spruce (Picea abies).  It has a strained ring system with a cyclopentane ring fused to a cyclopropane ring.

Sabinene is one of the chemical compounds that contributes to the spiciness of black pepper and is a major constituent of carrot seed oil. It also occurs in tea tree oil at a low concentration. It is also present in the essential oil obtained from nutmeg, Laurus nobilis, and Clausena anisata.

Biosynthesis 
Sabinene, a bicyclic monoterpene, is present in the (+) and (-) enantiomers. It is biosynthesized from the common terpenoid precursor, geranyl pyrophosphate (GPP) that undergoes polycyclization catalyzed by sabinene synthase (SabS). GPP is formed from the terpenoid synthesis pathway with the starter units, isopentenyl pyrophosphate (IPP) and dimethylallyl pyrophosphate (DMAPP). The starter units, IPP and DMAPP, can be synthesized from either the mevalonate (MVA) or the methylerythritol 4-phosphate (MEP) pathway. With the head-to-tail condensation of IPP and DMAPP catalyzed by GPP synthase, GPP is formed. Sabinene synthase (SabS) then catalyzes the ionization and isomerization of GPP to form 3R-linalyl pyrophosphate. Further ionization and cyclization results in the formation of sabinene.

See also
 Thujene, a double bond isomer of sabinene

References

Hydrocarbons
Alkene derivatives
Monoterpenes
Cyclopropanes
Cyclopentanes
Isopropyl compounds